Wilfred Hildreth (1896–1979) was an Indian sprinter. He competed in the men's 100 metres and 200 metres events during the 1924 Summer Olympics. He was the father of British hurdling athlete Peter Hildreth.

References

External links
 

1896 births
1979 deaths
Anglo-Indian people
Indian male sprinters
Athletes (track and field) at the 1924 Summer Olympics
Olympic athletes of India
Indian emigrants to England
British people of Anglo-Indian descent